Shimia biformata is a Gram-negative, strictly aerobic, rod-shaped and non-spore-forming bacterium from the genus of Shimia which has been isolated from seawater from Kending County in Taiwan.

References

External links
Type strain of Shimia biformata at BacDive -  the Bacterial Diversity Metadatabase

Rhodobacteraceae
Bacteria described in 2013